Anthony Graham (Tony) Sadler (born Sutton Coldfield 1 April 1936), is an Anglican priest: he was the inaugural Archdeacon of Walsall.

He was educated at Bishop Vesey's Grammar School, The Queen's College, Oxford and Lichfield Theological College;  and ordained in 1963.  After a curacy in Burton upon Trent he held Incumbencies in Dunstall, Abbots Bromley, Pelsall and of Uttoxeter before his appointment as Archdeacon.

References

1936 births
People educated at Bishop Vesey's Grammar School
Alumni of The Queen's College, Oxford
Alumni of Lichfield Theological College
20th-century English Anglican priests
21st-century English Anglican priests
Living people
People from Sutton Coldfield
Archdeacons of Walsall